Maria Encarnacion Berkenkotter (born 1962/1963) is an Associate Justice of the Colorado Supreme Court.

Education 

Berkenkotter received her Bachelor of Arts from Western Michigan University in 1984 and her Juris Doctor from the University of Denver College of Law in 1987.

Legal career 

After graduating law school, she was an associate with Holmes & Starr from 1988 to 1990, she then served as an Assistant Attorney General with the Colorado Attorney General Regulatory Law and Consumer Protection Sections from 1990 to 2000, and then First Assistant Attorney General with the Colorado Attorney General Consumer Protection Section from 2000 to 2006. From 2018 to 2021 she was arbiter with the Judicial Arbiter Group, Inc.

Judicial career

State court judicial service 

Berkenkotter served as a district judge on Colorado's 20th Judicial District from 2006 to 2017. She became Chief Judge on September 1, 2013 and retired on October 31, 2017.

Notable case 

In April 2016, Berkenkotter had received national attention when she sentenced 36 year-old Dynel Lane to 100 years in prison for cutting a baby from a woman's womb.

Colorado Supreme Court 

In May 2018, Berkenkotter was one of three candidates considered to fill the vacancy left by the retirement of Chief Justice Nancy E. Rice. In 2020, she was among three finalists for the Supreme Court. On November 20, 2020, Governor Jared Polis announced Berkenkotter his appointment to the Colorado Supreme Court to replace Justice Nathan B. Coats who retired on January 1, 2021.

References

External links 

Year of birth missing (living people)
Place of birth missing (living people)
1960s births
Living people
20th-century American lawyers
21st-century American judges
21st-century American lawyers
20th-century American women lawyers
Colorado lawyers
Colorado state court judges
Justices of the Colorado Supreme Court
University of Colorado Law School alumni
Western Michigan University alumni
21st-century American women judges